Piceno is an Italian word usually related to Ascoli Piceno and its province. It may refer to:

Languages

North Picene language (It.: Piceno Settentrionale), an extinct language of ancient Italy.
South Picene language (It.: Piceno Meridionale), an extinct language of ancient Italy.

Places of Italy
Picenum, a region of ancient Italy.
Province of Ascoli Piceno, a province of the Marche.
Ascoli Piceno, a town in the Marche region, seat of the homonymous province.
Acquaviva Picena, a municipality of the Province of Ascoli Piceno, Marche.
Belmonte Piceno, a municipality of the Province of Fermo, Marche.
Camerata Picena, a municipality of the Province of Ancona, Marche.
Loro Piceno, a municipality of the Province of Macerata, Marche.
Potenza Picena, a municipality of the Province of Macerata, Marche.
Porto Potenza Picena, a civil parish of Potenza Picena (MC), Marche.

People
Bruno Piceno (born 1991), Mexican footballer
Picentes (It.: Piceni), an ancient Italian people

See also
Picene, a polycyclic aromatic hydrocarbon.
Picene (disambiguation)